Apocalypso was released in 2011, although it was recorded in 1981 and intended to be the third studio album by the band The Motels.

Development 
Apocalypso was recorded between April and August 1981, but was rejected by the Capitol Records promotions department. The re-worked and released album was titled All Four One.  Apocalypso remained unreleased until 2011. The album was awarded the best re-issue award by the Independent Music Awards.

Track listing

Personnel 

The Motels
Martha Davis – vocals, rhythm guitar
Tim McGovern – lead guitar
Marty Jourard – keyboards, saxophone
Michael Goodroe – bass
Brian Glascock – drums

Production
Credits are taken from the CD's liner notes.
Produced by Val Garay
Produced for Release, 2011 by Cheryl Pawelski
Arranged by Tim McGovern
Assistant Production by Niko Bolas

References 

2011 albums
The Motels albums
Albums produced by Val Garay
Omnivore Recordings albums